Tatjana Gürbaca (born 1973, Berlin) is a German opera director.

Early life
Gürbaca was born in 1973 in Berlin, Germany to a Turkish father and an Italian mother.

Career
Gürbaca, frequently nominated by the journal 'Opernwelt' for her productions, was winner at the finals of RING AWARD 2000 and subsequently directed Turandot at Graz Opera. Gürbaca studied stage direction at Hochschule für Musik Hanns Eisler in Berlin. Her artistic education was completed by master courses given by Ruth Berghaus and Peter Konwitschny, among others. She was engaged by Berlin State Opera, Deutsche Oper Berlin, Wiener Volksoper, Oper Graz, Oper Leipzig, Deutsche Oper am Rhein Düsseldorf, Theater Bremen, Festspielhaus Baden-Baden, Opera Novosibirsk, Lucerne Festival, and many more. Since 2011 Gürbaca has been Opera Director at Staatstheater Mainz, where she has already directed several productions.

Works
2001, Turandot, Graz Opera
2001, La Canterina und Lo Speziale, Eisenstadt
2002, Brot und Spiele, Schauspielhaus Graz
2002, Mavra, Staatsoper Berlin
2003, Il prigioniero, Wiener Volksoper
2003, Dido und Aeneas, Festspielhaus Baden-Baden
2004, Pagliacci und Cavalleria rusticana, Theater Regensburg
2005, Cosi fan tutte, Luzerner Theater
2006, Die alte Jungfer und der Dieb, Graz Opera
2006, Les Contes d'Hoffmann, Graz Opera
2006, Mazeppa, Oper Bern
2006, Soliman II und Zaide, Theater Luzern
2006, Der schwarze Mönch (World Premiere), Oper Leipzig
2007, Rigoletto, Graz Opera
2007, Le Nozze di Figaro, Novosibirsk
2007, Cosi fan tutte, Prinzregententheater, Munich
2007, Lucia di Lammermoor, Staatstheater Mainz
2007, Le Grand Macabre, Theater Bremen, with Sara Hershkowitz
2008, Die Entführung aus dem Serail, Theater Augsburg
2008, Werther, Staatstheater Mainz
2008, Der Fliegende Holländer, Deutsche Oper Berlin
2008, Manon, Staatstheater Mainz
2009, Mazeppa, Vlaamse Opera, Antwerpen
2009, Carmen, Oper Leipzig
2009, Salome, Deutsche Oper am Rhein
2010, Eugen Onegin, Vlaamse Opera
2011, Macbeth (Sciarrino), Staatstheater Mainz
2012, Un ballo in maschera, Staatstheater Mainz
2013, Macbeth, Staatstheater Mainz

Awards
, 2000

References

German opera directors
German people of Italian descent
German people of Turkish descent
Female opera directors
1973 births
Living people